Kerala Public Works Department (KPWD) is a department under the government of the state of Kerala, India. It manages the construction and maintenance of civil structures owned by the government viz; government buildings, government owned hospitals (part of the public health system), roads, bridges etc. The KPWD was formed in 1956 following reorganization of states.

History 
In Kochi, British Residents had a separate department called Public Works Commission to carry off construction works in British Cochin. The kingdom had its own Marmath Department since 1825, as a separate agency to monitor construction of roads and palaces.

In 1901, the Kingdoms of Travancore and Kochi agreed to have an unified PWD Code and a permanent Joint commission of PWD Engineers in both sides were formed. The Travancore Maramath was headed by a chief engineer, whereas it was a Diwan Peshkar (State Secretary) who headed Kochi Marmath.

In 1949, when United State of Travancore-Cochin was formed, both the Maramath Departments were merged and renamed as Kerala PWD. Over the years the department has grown substantially and now has 8 Chief Engineers, 25 Superintending Engineers, 76 Executive Engineers, 289 Assistant Executive Engineers, 639 Assistant Engineers and other supporting staff.

About Department 

The department is headed by a senior minister of cabinet rank. Presently P. A. Mohammed Riyas, representing Beypore Constituency is the minister for PWD.  The Minister is assisted by a senior IAS officer, Secretary for Public Works who heads the secretariat functions. As a technical department, it has a council composed of Chief Engineers and technical advisors along with nominated representatives from economical and social spheres.

Wings

 Administration Wing
This wing is headed by a Chief Engineer and deals with matters related to the general administration and human resources management pertains to the whole department. Establishment matters, human resource development, Information technology & e-Governance related matters and internal vigilance are the main functions of this wing. Administration wing functions from the head office at Thiruvananthapuram and there are no sub-offices for this wing at any parts of the State. The following are the main sections under the administration wing.
 Roads Wing
Roads wing deals with the planning, project preparation, construction, maintenance and arrangement of works of all State Highways and Major District Roads under the State. This wing is having its headquarters at Thiruvananthapuram and is under the control of a Chief Engineer who is assisted by a Deputy Chief Engineer, a Senior Finance Officer and supported by technical and other ministerial staff. This wing have field offices with Circle offices at regional level, division offices at district level, sub-division offices at taluk level and Section offices at the lowest level.

There are three Circle offices under the roads wing namely south circle, Central circle and North circle each headed by a Superintending Engineer. Under each Circle offices there are division offices headed by an Executive Engineer. The sub-division offices are headed by Assistant Executive Engineer and Section offices are headed by Assistant Engineer.

PWD roads constitute 15 per cent of the total road network in the State carrying which carries nearly 80 per cent of the total road traffic within the State. The total length of roads maintained by Roads Wing is 29109.68 km out of which 4127.74 km is State Highways and 24975.34 km is Major District Roads (MDRs) .
 Bridges Wing
Bridges wing is formed exclusively for the construction and maintenance of various types of bridges under Kerala PWD on 27.03.2018 as a part of the initiative "Puthiya kalam Puthiya nirmanam". This wing is formed based on the Road and Bridge Maintenance Policy of the Government. This wing is headed by a Chief Engineer (Bridges) with supporting staff. This wing is having its headquarters at Thiruvananthapuram with two circle offices seven division offices fourteen subdivisions and forty section offices.

A total number of 2768 bridges are being maintained by PWD Bridges Wing, Kerala out of which 427 bridges are in State Highways and 1938 are in Major District Roads/ Other District Roads.
 National Highways Wing
National Highways wing of the State PWD was formed for the maintenance and upkeep of National Highways entrusted to State PWD in accordance with NH Act 1956 by Ministry of Road Transport and Highways(MoRTH), Government of India. There are 11 National Highways in Kerala with a total length of 1781.36 km and of which 1540.56 km of NH is currently maintained by the State PWD. The remaining 240.8 km is currently with the National Highway Authority of India(NHAI) as part of the four/six laning programme of MoRTH.
 Buildings Wing
The buildings wing deals with the planning, project preparation, construction, maintenance and arrangement of works including water supply, electrification and electronic works of public buildings.  The headquarters of buildings wing is at Thiruvananthapuram and is under the control of a Chief Engineer assisted by Deputy Chief Engineer and a Senior Finance Officer supported by technical and non-technical staff. The organisational structure of buildings wing is as below

Apart from the regular field offices like circle, division, sub-division and section offices, the following additional offices also works under the Buildings wing
 Projects Wing
Projects wing is formed to execute externally aided projects and specialised projects. Currently this wing is executing the World Bank aided Kerala State Transport Project (KSTP). Administration head of this wing will be the IAS officer (Project Director) and technically headed by a Chief Engineer. The main aim of this wing is upgradation of the State Highway. The organisational structure of Projects wing is as below

Apart from the regular field offices like two circle and four division offices, the following additional offices also works under the Projects wing 
 Design Wing
Design wing of PWD deals with the design, research, investigation and quality control aspects of various infrastructure projects and is headed by a Chief Engineer. Chief Engineer is assisted by the Director (Research & Quality Control), Director (Buildings) and Director (Highways) in the design and quality control aspects. 

At present, the department is having specialised units for structural design of buildings, design of bridges, design of highways,  Geotechnical engineering unit, Environmental engineering unit, MEP design unit for Building services (Electrical design, Plumbing design and HVAC design) and a project preparation unit with sufficient staff strength. The Design wing is functioning with headquarters in the office of the Chief Engineer (Design) in Thiruvananthapuram known as Chief Design Office (CDO). In addition there are Regional Design Offices (RDO) at Eranakulum and Kozhikode. Apart from this there is a full-fledged investigation and quality control wing under the Design wing which is having regional I&QC laboratories at Thiruvananthapuram, Eranakulam and Kozhikode with sufficient district level quality control laboratories.

The Kerala Highway Research Institute (KHRI) at Thiruvananthapuram carries out research & quality control works and gives advice and guidance for advanced construction works undertaken by the department. KHRI has well established laboratories for Soil Mechanics and Foundation Division, Concrete Division, Traffic Division and Flexible Pavement Division.
 Road Maintenance Wing
Road Maintenance wing is formed for maintaining various types of roads under the control of Kerala PWD through the adoption of new technologies and methods. This wing is formed based on the Road and Bridge Maintenance Policy of the Government.  This wing is headed by a Chief Engineer (Road Maintenance) with supporting staff. This wing is having its headquarters at Thiruvananthapuram with seven division offices fourteen subdivisions. The organisational setup of the Road Maintenance wing is as shown below
 Architectural Wing

The Architectural wing is responsible for the preparation and finalization of all architectural designs and drawings for buildings and similar works to be executed by the Public Works Department. Though primarily intended for the Buildings branch, the assistance of Architectural wing is taken for architectural designs in the other areas of construction such as bridges, highway structures, landscaping and urban beautification works etc. This wing headed by a Chief Architect and supported by other Architects having its main office in Thiruvananthapuram . There are two regional offices also at Ernakulam and Kozhikode. The organizational setup of the Architectural wing is as shown below

The following organisations are functioning under the Department.

 Kerala State Transport Project
 Roads and Bridges Development Corporation of Kerala Ltd.
 Kerala Road Fund Board
 Kerala State Construction Corporation Ltd.
 Kerala Rapid Transit Corporation Ltd
 Road Infrastructure Company Kerala Limited
 Pratheeksha Bus Shelters Kerala Ltd
 Ashwas Public Amenities Kerala Ltd

Rest Houses 
PWD also have several Tourist Bungalows located in various important tourist destinations, available for tourists for daily rent, though the government has started the process of handing over several TBs to KTDC.

References

See also 
 Roads in Kerala
 Roads and Bridges Development Corporation
 Central Public Works Department

Government departments of Kerala
State Public Works Departments of India
Buildings and structures in Kerala
1823 establishments in India
Organisations based in Thiruvananthapuram